Marjolein Delno (born 17 March 1994) is a Dutch swimmer. She competed in the women's 200 metre individual medley event at the 2017 World Aquatics Championships.

References

External links
 

1994 births
Living people
Dutch female medley swimmers
Dutch female freestyle swimmers
Place of birth missing (living people)
European Aquatics Championships medalists in swimming
European Championships (multi-sport event) silver medalists
20th-century Dutch women
21st-century Dutch women